Controller, in comics, may refer to:

Controller (Marvel Comics), a supervillain in Marvel Comics
Controllers (DC Comics), an alien race in DC Comics

See also
Controller (disambiguation)